"Iron Lady" is a nickname of Margaret Thatcher (1925–2013), the first female prime minister of the United Kingdom.

Iron Lady may also refer to:

Film and television
The Iron Ladies, a 2008 Thai film
The Iron Lady (film), a 2011 biographical film about Margaret Thatcher
The Iron Lady (TV series), a 2009 Malaysian series about a strong-willed Chinese woman

Music
The Iron Lady (album), a 1979 satirical album about Margaret Thatcher
"Iron Lady", a song by Phil Ochs

Other uses
Vénus de Quinipily or The Iron Lady, an ancient statue in Brittany, France
Margaret Thatcher: The Iron Lady, a 2003 biography by John Campbell
"Britain Awake", a 1976 speech by Thatcher sometimes called the "Iron Lady speech"

People with the nickname

Martine Aubry (born 1950), Minister of Labour of France (1991–1993)
Benazir Bhutto (1953–2007), Prime Minister of Pakistan (1988–1990 and 1993–1996)
Anson Chan (born 1940), Hong Kong Chief Secretary for Administration (1997–2001)
Eugenia Charles (1919–2005), Prime Minister of Dominica (1980–1995)
Indira Gandhi (1917–1984), Prime Minister of India (1966–1977 and 1980–1984)
Dalia Grybauskaitė (born 1956), President of Lithuania (2009–2019)
Katinka Hosszú (born 1989), Olympic champion swimmer from Hungary
J. Jayalalithaa (1948–2016), Chief Minister of Tamil Nadu five times between 1991 and her death
Carrie Lam (born 1957), Hong Kong Chief Secretary for Administration (2012–2017) and Chief Executive since 2017
Golda Meir (1898–1978), Prime Minister of Israel (1969–1974)
Angela Merkel (born 1954), Chancellor of Germany (2005–2021)
Natalia Petkevich (born 1972), First Deputy Head of the Presidential Administration of Belarus (2009–2010)
Biljana Plavšić (born 1930), President of Republika Srpska (1996–1998)
Miriam Defensor Santiago (1945–2016), Senator of the Philippines and Judge of the International Criminal Court
Irom Chanu Sharmila (born 1972), civil rights activist from Manipur state in India
Ellen Johnson Sirleaf (born 1938), President of Liberia (2006–2018) and Nobel Peace Prize recipient (2011)
Wu Yi (born 1938), Vice Premier of China (2003–2008)

See also
Iron Baron (disambiguation)
Iron Crown (disambiguation)
Iron Duke (disambiguation)
Iron Lord (disambiguation)
Iron Maiden (disambiguation)
Iron Man (disambiguation)
Iron Throne (disambiguation)
Iron Woman (disambiguation)
Margaret Thatcher (disambiguation)